is a party video game developed by NDcube and published by Nintendo for the Nintendo 3DS. The third handheld game in the Mario Party series, it was announced by Satoru Iwata in a Nintendo Direct presentation in April 2013, and was released in November 2013 in North America, in January 2014 in Europe and Australia, and in March 2014 in Japan. The game features seven boards, each with their own special features, and 81 new minigames.  It was followed by Mario Party 10 for the Wii U in 2015.

Gameplay 

The gameplay is similar to previous installments in the Wii Party and Mario Party series. By rolling the Dice Block or using a card, the player advances on the game board and might trigger an event or minigame. The minigames can be played any time, even when not on a game board; the game also features AR (augmented reality) and StreetPass. Each board has its own rules, such as racing to the finish and using items to enhance the amount of spaces advanced as well as hinder opponents and collecting the most Mini Stars to win. The game has 7 boards: Perilous Palace Path, Banzai Bill's Mad Mountain, Star-Crossed Skyway, Rocket Road, Kamek's Carpet Ride, Shy Guy's Shuffle City, and Bowser's Peculiar Peak/Bowser's Bizarre Volcano (which is unlocked by completing every board except for Shy Guy's Shuffle City). There are 10 playable characters: Mario, Luigi, Princess Peach, Princess Daisy, Wario, Waluigi, Yoshi, Boo, Toad, and Bowser Jr., who is unlocked by beating all 30 floors of Bowser's Tower.

Reception 

Island Tour received "mixed" reviews according to the review aggregation website Metacritic.  In Japan, Famitsu gave it a score of all four eights, for a total of 32 out of 40. 

Game Revolution praised the 7 new boards and boss minigames; however, the repetitive gameplay, character voices and board music were criticized. GamesRadar said, "Island Tour isn't the Mario Party you remember, and that's not necessarily a bad thing. That said, there are definitely some missing pieces that keep it from being a memorable entry in the franchise." GameSpot commended the game's usage of four-player local download play, great minigame designs, and also Island Tours single-player mode, but criticized "a few bad games in the bunch", and the lack of online play. IGN said, "Mario Party: Island Tour’s rich multiplayer options are sullied by boring minigames and unfortunate motion control." Nintendo World Report listed Island Tour'''s pros as being the game boards, "extensive" single-player mode, and the fact that it utilizes almost all the Nintendo 3DS features, and the cons as the fact that the difficulty of Bowser's Tower is not changeable, the instruction screens, which they described as "repetitive", and also that there is no online multiplayer. Pocket Gamer said, "Island Tour'' will provide you and a bunch of mates with a great evening of laughs, but most of the time you'll be laughing AT it rather than with it."

Notes

References

External links 

2013 video games
Mario Party
Multiplayer and single-player video games
NDcube games
Nintendo 3DS eShop games
Nintendo 3DS games
Nintendo 3DS-only games
Party video games
Video games developed in Japan
Video games set on fictional islands